The 17th International Architecture Exhibition of the Venice Architecture Biennale, is an upcoming international architecture exhibition. The Biennale takes place biennially in Venice, Italy. Due to the COVID-19 pandemic, the exhibition will take place in 2021 instead of 2020.

Background 

The 17th Exhibition will run between May 22 and November 21, 2021, with two pre-opening days. In light of several festival postponements in northern Italy due to the COVID-19 pandemic, there had been speculation about delaying the exhibition, and while it was originally announced as opening in May, amid increased international precautions over the following weeks, the exhibition's opening was initially postponed to August, halving the exhibition's run, before being rescheduled to the following year

Central exhibition 

Curated by Hashim Sarkis, the exhibition's theme is "How will we live together?" From 46 participating countries, 114 participants will present work at the Giardini's Central Pavilion, the Arsenale, Forte Marghera, and the external spaces around those areas. National participants were asked to focus on "the need for more inclusive social housing and urban connectivity."

National pavilions 

The exhibition will include 63 national pavilions in the Giardini and across the city. The 17th exhibition marked the first participation from Grenada, Iraq, and Uzbekistan.

Awards 

The exhibition's awards will be presented at its inauguration.

References

External links 

 

Venice Architecture Biennale exhibitions
2020 architecture
2020 in Italy
May 2020 events in Italy